Daga Rural LLG is a local-level government (LLG) of Milne Bay Province, Papua New Guinea.

Wards
01. Gaunani
02. Birat
03. Bonenau
04. Param
05. Kakaia
06. Payawa
07. Ilakae - Modeni
08. Uni
09. Bibitan
10. Danawan
11. Biman
12. Gwagut
13. Gwadede
14. Eviaua
15. Gwaira
16. Kanaturu
17. Gauwa
18. Gwiroro

References

Local-level governments of Milne Bay Province